The 2004–05 Amiens SC season was the club's 104th season in existence and the fourth consecutive season in the second division of French football. In addition to the domestic league, Amiens participated in this season's edition of the Coupe de France and the Coupe de la Ligue. The season covered the period from 1 July 2004 to 30 June 2005.

Players

First-team squad

Transfers

In

Out

Pre-season and friendlies

Competitions

Overview

Ligue 2

League table

Results summary

Results by round

Matches

Coupe de France

Coupe de la Ligue

References

External links

Amiens SC seasons
Amiens